Peristoreus is a weevil genus native to New Zealand. This genus was first described in 1877 by Theodor Franz Wilhelm Kirsch.

Species
Species contained within the genus of Peristoreus are:

References

External links

 Citizen science observations of species in this genus

Curculioninae
Curculionidae genera
Beetles of New Zealand
Endemic fauna of New Zealand
Endemic insects of New Zealand